SonicWall is an American cybersecurity company that sells a range of Internet appliances primarily directed at content control and network security. These include devices providing services for network firewalls, unified threat management (UTM), virtual private networks (VPNs), virtual firewalls, SD-WAN, cloud security and anti-spam for email. The company also markets information subscription services related to their products. The company also assists in solving problems surrounding compliance with the Health Insurance Portability and Accountability Act (HIPAA) and the Payment Card Industry Data Security Standard (PCI-DSS). 

Originally a private company headquartered in Silicon Valley, it went public in 1999, before delisting in 2010. On March 13, 2012, USA Today said that Dell had announced its intent to acquire SonicWall, which then had 130 patents and 950 employees. Dell's acquisition of SonicWall became official on May 9, 2012.

On June 20, 2016, Dell sold SonicWall (part of its Dell Software division) to private equity firm Francisco Partners and Elliott Management.

History
In 1991, Brothers Sreekanth Ravi and Sudhakar Ravi founded the company under the name Sonic Systems to develop ethernet and fast ethernet cards, hubs and bridges for the Apple market.

In the late 1990s, the company released a security product initially called Interpol and later branded SonicWALL, a dedicated hardware appliance with firewall and VPN software intended for the small-business market. As sales for the security appliances rapidly accelerated, the company exited the Apple add-on networking business and refocused exclusively as a network security company.

In late 1999, the company changed its name from Sonic Systems to SonicWALL, Inc. to represent the shift to network security, and in November 1999 SonicWall went public on the Nasdaq with the symbol SNWL.

In 2001, SonicWall upgraded its Global Management System (GMS) software to manage more VPN devices.

Matthew T. Medeiros (formerly of Philips Components) became CEO in March 2003. SonicWall has acquired several companies during its existence, often expanding its product line in the process. In 2005, SonicWall announced the acquisition of enKoo, and in 2007, SonicWall announced the acquisition of Aventail Corporation.

On July 23, 2010, SonicWall announced that it had completed its merger with affiliates of an investor group led by Thoma Bravo, LLC, which included the Ontario Teachers' Pension Plan through its private investor department, Teachers' Private Capital. After the merger SonicWall was delisted from NASDAQ.

On March 13, 2012, Dell announced that they had signed a definitive agreement to acquire SonicWall.

On May 20, 2016, Dell announced the sale of Dell Software, which included SonicWall, to private equity firm Francisco Partners and Elliott Management.

In March 2021, the SonicWall SecureFirst partner program received a five-star rating in the 2021 CRN Partner Program Guide.

On January 22, 2021, SonicWall said it was attacked by "highly sophisticated threat actors" in a potential zero-day attack on certain SonicWall secure remote access products. On January 25, former lulzsec hacker Darren Martyn announced exploits against old VPN vulnerabilities. These exploits and the January 2021 attack were unrelated; SonicWall confirmed that the Martyn exploits were patched in 2015.

On January 7, 2022, SonicWall said that some of its email security and firewall products were hit by the Y2k22 bug and released patches after a few days.

On July 21, 2022, SoncWall announced that former President and CEO Bill Conner would take on the role of Executive Chairmen of the Board. Former SonicWall Chief Revenue Officer Bob VanKirk was named President and CEO.

References 

1991 establishments in California
2012 mergers and acquisitions
Companies acquired by Dell
Companies based in San Jose, California
American companies established in 1991
Software companies established in 1991
Companies formerly listed on the Nasdaq
Computer security companies
Content-control software
Networking companies of the United States
Networking hardware companies
Server appliance
Software companies based in the San Francisco Bay Area
Telecommunications equipment vendors
2016 mergers and acquisitions
1999 initial public offerings
Software companies of the United States
Private equity portfolio companies